The IHF Emerging Nations Championship is a men's handball tournament organized by the International Handball Federation since 2015, directed to play with emerging teams. Its first edition was held in Kosovo from June 20 to 26.

Countries that currently participate are those in the “Four-year plan” of the European Handball Federation and the best ranked countries from other continents that did not qualify for the World Men's Handball Championship.

Tournaments

Medal count

Participation details

References

External links
IHF website
2015 Tournament Official webpage

 
International handball competitions
Recurring sporting events established in 2015
2015 establishments in Europe
Emerging Nations